is a manga series created by Rei Omishi and it follows the journeys of an apprentice shinigami, or death god, named Risky and an apprentice angel named Safety who have been trapped in the same body. Whoever is in charge of the body depends on the emotions of those around them; if people are happy, then Safety appears, but if people are upset, then Risky takes charge.

Characters
 Risky  A shinigami in training, Risky takes to her job quite gleefully. She is robed in a skull studded black outfit with a jewel in the center, long black stockings, and a large hat that looks like a cross between a ten-gallon hat and a stereotypical witch's hat. She has black hair and dark blue-grey eyes. She wields a scythe that, among other things, can take the souls of the living who are filled with sadness, present illusions dealing with the cause of the current target's sadness, and act as a microphone. Risky isn't as cruel as she leads people to think, since she tried to undo the damage she did in Moe's room when she first arrived when she was given a new assignment.

 Safety  An angel in training, Safety takes just as much joy bringing happiness and blessings as Risky does taking souls. She wears a simple white robe, with a small jewel and collar as the only things that stick out. She also has a jewel on her forehead. She has long blue-green hair, which she ties up in pink bands, and slightly darker blue-green eyes. She is near-sighted, so she must wear glasses. She can summon a bow and arrow which acts like Cupid's arrow, causing anyone to fall in love with the first person they see. Thanks to a passing ambulance, she hit a neighbor's dog, Lani, with it.

 Moe Katsuragi  She starts off in the series depressed because the boy she likes seems to be interested in other women. This depression summons Risky. Thanks to a small compliment to Risky, Safety takes over and sets the record straight.

 Yuya Fukami  Moe's de facto boyfriend, a sweet younger boy whom she met at a phone booth, when she forgot her phone card and he returned it.

 Lani  A dog that, thanks to Safety's arrow, is infatuated with Risky and Safety.

Voices
Risky

Safety

Moe Katsuragi

Yuya Fukami

Lani

Fazzy Serges

Mrs. Katsuragi

Mr. Katsuragi

Manga before Anime
There are 3 manga publications that were issued before this anime under the same name (Omishi Magical Theater: Risky Safety), created by Rei Omishi.

There are a few differences between the manga and the anime. The greatest difference is that the stories in the manga do not concentrate on one person (i.e. Risky and Safety travel around), where the anime is focused on Moe Katsuragi.

Other differences include:
 The clothing and its colours of Risky and Safety have minor changes, like:
 Risky's main colour of dressing is crimson in manga instead of grey in anime.
 Safety's hair is blue in the manga but cyan in the anime.
 Risky and Safety are both 13 cm (as stated in the official site) in the anime, while in the manga version they are of normal human height.
 In manga, Moe Katsuragi usually wears her eyeglasses, but in anime, she wears contact lenses when she goes to school or when she meets Yuya Fukami.

External links
 

1999 anime television series debuts
1999 manga
Comedy anime and manga
Dengeki Comic Gao!
Kadokawa Dwango franchises
Television shows written by Yōsuke Kuroda
Shōnen manga